Kulanch is a sub-tehsil of Pasni, Gwadar District, Balochistan in Pakistan People living there are known as Kulanchi.

After Meds, they are known as primitive population of Gwadar. Kulanch is a large cultivable land beginning 50 km east from Gwadar city and ending near Pasni. 

The towns there are Belar, Nalient, Kallag and Kappar. The major tribes living here are Puzzh(Rind), Band(Jamali), Wadela(Mengal), Jadgal, Mullai, Sangur, Maldar(Bizenjo), and Rekani.

Gwadar District